Ren Guiping (born 2 April 1960) is a Chinese cross-country skier. She competed in two events at the 1980 Winter Olympics.

References

External links
 

1960 births
Living people
Chinese female cross-country skiers
Olympic cross-country skiers of China
Cross-country skiers at the 1980 Winter Olympics
Place of birth missing (living people)